Dan Inge Jörgen Lennartsson (born 10 April 1965) is a Swedish football manager and former player. He is currently the head coach of the Allsvenskan team Helsingborgs IF.

Career
Lennartsson was born in Växjö. He took over Elfsborg from Magnus Haglund who had been in Elfsborg for 8 years, but moved to be the trainer in Lillestrøm SK. Jörgen had been under Elfsborg's radar for a long time, not only for his achievements with the U-21, the bronze medal in UEFA European Under-21 Football Championship, but mostly for his passion to football and his strong authority and leadership. He has much knowledge about football and experience as a trainer after 20 years at the sideline. 
His first player to buy was Joackim Jørgensen from Sarpsborg 08 in Norway, a player as he described was much alike Jari Ilola. He played in the Europa League qualification 2012–13 with Elfsborg.

Lennartsson is former manager of Stabæk, where he started January 2011. Before Stabæk, he was the manager of the Swedish U21 team after he was held in many positions in various clubs in Sweden, the majority of which were youth coach and assistant manager positions.

After the appointment of Erik Hamrén as the head coach of the Sweden national football team there was speculation about Lennartsson being appointed assistant coach.

On 2 August 2010, Stabæk announced that Lennartson would take over as head coach, and replace Jan Jönsson on 1 January 2011. But only after one season in Stabæk Jörgen had to leave his post as a manager due to Stabæks big economic problems. Before Allsvenskan season 2012 Jörgen signed a four-year contract as a head manager for IF Elfsborg.

On 30 September 2013, IF Elfsborg sacked manager Jörgen Lennartsson.

Before the start of the 2015 Allsvenskan season, IFK Göteborg appointed Lennartsson as manager following the sacking of previous head coach Mikael Stahre.

Honours

Manager
BK Häcken
Superettan: 2004 Superettan

IF Elfsborg
Allsvenskan: 2012 Allsvenskan

References

External links
Profile at the Swedish football association

Living people
1965 births
Swedish footballers
Association football midfielders
Swedish football managers
BK Häcken managers
Stabæk Fotball managers
IF Elfsborg managers
IFK Göteborg managers
Lillestrøm SK managers
Helsingborgs IF managers
Östers IF non-playing staff
Helsingborgs IF non-playing staff
Swedish expatriate football managers
Swedish expatriate sportspeople in Norway
Expatriate football managers in Norway
Allsvenskan managers
Eliteserien managers
People from Växjö
Sportspeople from Kronoberg County